Sigmatineurum is a genus of fly in the family Dolichopodidae. It is endemic to Hawaii, occurring on all the main islands in the archipelago. It is part of the Eurynogaster complex of genera.

Species
Sigmatineurum binodatum (Parent, 1939)
Sigmatineurum chalybeum Parent, 1938
Sigmatineurum englundi Evenhuis, 2000
Sigmatineurum iao Evenhuis, 1994
Sigmatineurum meaohi Evenhuis, 1997
Sigmatineurum mnemogagne Evenhuis, 1994
Sigmatineurum napali Evenhuis, 1994
Sigmatineurum nigrum Evenhuis, 1997
Sigmatineurum omega Evenhuis, 1994
Sigmatineurum parenti Evenhuis, 1997
Sigmatineurum puleloai Englund & Evenhuis, 2005

References

Hydrophorinae
Dolichopodidae genera
Insects of Hawaii
Endemic fauna of Hawaii
Taxa named by Octave Parent